Pajęczno  is a town in Poland, in Łódź Voivodeship, about  north of Częstochowa.  It is the capital of Pajęczno County (powiat pajęczański).  Population is 6,651 (2020).

History
First mentioned in historical sources from 1140, when it was part of Piast-ruled Poland. It had town rights between 1276 and 1870, and again from 1958. It was a royal town of the Polish Crown, administratively located in the Sieradz Voivodeship in the Greater Poland Province of the Polish Crown.

A Jewish community had been residents of Pajęczno since the late 1700s and numbered about 700 at the beginning of World War II. When the Germans occupied the town in September 1939, they unleashed a violent attack against the Jewish community, beginning with murder and abuse, then stripping Jews of most of their property, and in 1941, confining them to an overcrowded ghetto. After that, Jews were expelled to forced labour camps and then in August 1942, many were murdered in the town and most of the rest were sent to the Chełmno extermination camp where they were immediately gassed. In 1942, the Germans also expelled 312 Poles, who were deported to a transit camp in nearby Wieluń and then to forced labour in Germany and German-occupied France. The last few dozen Jews were sent to the Lodz ghetto. Very few Pajęczno Jews survived the war.

On 14 June 2019 an intoxicated man drove through the town in a T-55 tank and was arrested shortly after.

The current mayor is Dariusz Tokarski.

References

External links
Website created by Pajęczno residents
Official town website
Niezależny Portal Pajęczna

Cities and towns in Łódź Voivodeship
Pajęczno County
Sieradz Voivodeship (1339–1793)
Piotrków Governorate
Łódź Voivodeship (1919–1939)